"Amore Mio" (English: My Love) is a song by Mexican singer-songwriter Thalía from her twelfth studio album of the same name (2014). The song was written by José Luis Ortega and produced by Armando Avila and was released by Sony Music Latin as the second single from the album in the Mexican territory on January 20, 2015.

Release and reception
In the Mexican territory, the  song was officially announced by Sony Music as the second single of the album. Thalía has mentioned  that she dedicated the song to her husband Tommy Mottola.
The song debuted in Mexico's general airplay chart, gaining even more airplay than the album's first single and peaking at #1. In the pop chart, published by Monitor Latino, the song also peaked at #1.

Video
Though the song does not have an official music video, Thalía did release an official lyric video for the song on her YouTube channel.

Charts

Weekly charts

Year-end charts

References 

 

Thalía songs
2015 singles
Sony Music Latin singles
Spanish-language songs
2015 songs
Pop ballads